Hesperidin is a flavanone glycoside found in citrus fruits. Its aglycone form is called hesperetin. Its name is derived from the word "hesperidium", for fruit produced by citrus trees.

Hesperidin was first isolated in 1828 by French chemist M. Lebreton from the white inner layer of citrus peels (mesocarp, albedo).

Hesperidin is believed to play a role in plant defense.

Sources

Rutaceae
 700–2,500 ppm in fruit of Citrus aurantium (bitter orange, petitgrain)
 in orange juice (Citrus sinensis)
 in Zanthoxylum gilletii
 in lemon 
 in lime 
 in leaves of Agathosma serratifolia

Lamiaceae
Peppermint contains hesperidin.

Content in foods

Approximate hesperidin content per 100 ml

 481 mg peppermint, dried
 44 mg blood orange, pure juice
 26 mg orange, pure juice
 18 mg lemon, pure juice
 14 mg lime, pure juice
 1 mg grapefruit, pure juice

Metabolism 
Hesperidin 6-O-α--rhamnosyl-β--glucosidase, an enzyme that uses hesperidin and water to produce hesperetin and rutinose, is found in the Ascomycetes species.

Research 
As a flavanone found in the rinds of citrus fruits (such as oranges or lemons), hesperidin is under preliminary research for its possible biological properties in vivo. One review did not find evidence that hesperidin affected blood lipid levels or hypertension. Another review found that hesperidin may improve endothelial function in humans, but the overall results were inconclusive.

Biosynthesis 

The biosynthesis of hesperidin stems from the phenylpropanoid pathway, in which the natural amino acid -phenylalanine undergoes a deamination by phenylalanine ammonia lyase to afford (E)-cinnamate. The resulting monocarboxylate undergoes an oxidation by cinnamate 4-hydroxylase to afford (E)-4-coumarate, which is transformed into (E)-4-coumaroyl-CoA by 4-coumarate-CoA ligase. (E)-4-coumaroyl-CoA is then subjected to the type III polyketide synthase naringenin chalcone synthase, undergoing successive condensation reactions and ultimately a ring-closing Claisen condensation to afford naringenin chalcone. The corresponding chalcone undergoes an isomerization by chalcone isomerase to afford (2S)-naringenin, which is oxidized to (2S)-eriodictyol by flavonoid 3′-hydroxylase. After O-methylation by caffeoyl-CoA O-methyltransferase, the hesperitin product undergoes a glycosylation by flavanone 7-O-glucosyltransferase to afford hesperitin-7-O-β--glucoside. Finally, a rhamnosyl moiety is introduced to the monoglycosylated product by 1,2-rhamnosyltransferase, forming hesperidin.

See also 
 Diosmin
 List of phytochemicals in food
 List of MeSH codes (D03)
 List of food additives

References

External links 

Flavanone glycosides
Flavonoid antioxidants
Bitter compounds
Flavonoids found in Rutaceae